William Daly may refer to:
William Davis Daly (1851–1900), American congressman from New Jersey
William Merrigan Daly (1887–1936), musician
William Daly (hurler) (1877–?), Irish hurler
William T. Daly, educator and American football and baseball player and coach
William Robert Daly (1871–?), actor and director of silent films
Will H. Daly (1869–1924), American labor leader based in Oregon State
Bill Daly (born 1964), Deputy Commissioner of the National Hockey League
Bill Daly (footballer) (1892–1980), Australian rules footballer
Will Daly (rower) (born 1983), American lightweight rower
Willie John Daly (1925–2017), Irish hurler and coach

See also
William Daley (disambiguation)
William Daily (disambiguation)
William Dailey (disambiguation)